Giovanni Lanfranco (26 January 1582 – 30 November 1647) was an Italian painter of the Baroque period.

Biography
Giovanni Gaspare Lanfranco was born in Parma, the third son of Stefano and Cornelia Lanfranchi, and was placed as a page in the household of Count Orazio Scotti. His talent for drawing allowed him to begin an apprenticeship with the Bolognese artist Agostino Carracci, brother of Annibale Carracci, working alongside fellow Parmese Sisto Badalocchio in the local Farnese palaces. When Agostino died in 1602, both young artists moved to Annibale's large and prominent Roman workshop, which was then involved in working on the Galleria Farnese in the Palazzo Farnese gallery ceiling. Lanfranco is considered to have contributed to the panel of Polyphemus and Galatea (replica in Doria Gallery) and some minor works in the room.

Afterwards, while still technically a member of the Carracci studio of Carracci, Lanfranco, along with Guido Reni and Francesco Albani, frescoed the Herrera (San Diego) Chapel in San Giacomo degli Spagnoli (1602–1607). He also participated in the fresco decoration of San Gregorio Magno and of the Cappella Paolina in Santa Maria Maggiore.

Independent work

By 1605, Lanfranco was obtaining some independent commissions; for example, he contributed paintings to the Camerino degli Eremiti in the Palazzetto Farnese (also known as Casino della Morte), once a low building on the Via Giulia, adjacent to the church of Santa Maria dell’Orazione e Morte. The camerino had been constructed by Cardinal Odoardo Farnese, next to his palace and gardens, and was destroyed in 1734 to allow for the construction of the aforementioned church. Of the canvases and frescoes by Domenichino, Girolamo Pulzone, Paul Bril, and Lanfranco, some are conserved in the new church. Among other works, Lanfranco contributed to this series, the eccentric Translation of the Magdalen.

After the death of Annibale Carracci in 1609, and with the Emilian school of painting temporarily out of favor, Lanfranco returned to his native Parma for two years.  There, he met Bartolomeo Schedoni and painted the altarpiece for the Ognissanti church. Lanfranco also produced paintings and altarpieces in  Orvieto, Vallerano, Leonessa and Fermo.

Return to Rome
After his return to Rome by 1612, Lanfranco competed with other Carracci students and assistants—including Reni, Albani, and Domenichino—for Roman patronage. Reni, however, was soon to depart for Naples and then Bologna. During the following decades in Rome, through the 1620s, Lanfranco and Domenichino engaged in a rivalry for the main fresco commissions. A measure of the competition can be gauged from Lanfranco's public accusation, not wholly without merit, that Domenichino had plagiarized Agostino Carracci in his painting of the Confession of St. Jerome, now in the Vatican.

Unlike Domenichino, Lanfranco was fairly eclectic in terms of style but preferred a visionary, theatrical approach suitable for the ceiling paintings gaining currency in the early 17th century. His works suggest some influence from the late work of Ludovico Carracci, a cousin of Agostino and Annibale, and possibly from Caravaggio (as, for example, in the altarpiece depicting the Inspiration of Saint Luke at Piacenza(1611)), though the stylistic importance of Caravaggio to Lanfranco has been disputed. In other works, he assimilated and adapted the style of his compatriot and predecessor of the 16th century, Antonio Correggio, as in his Adoration of the Shepherds painted before 1608 for the Marchese Clemente Sannesi and his brother the Cardinal Jacopo.

Lanfranco's studio became quite active, painting frescoes in the Palazzo Mattei and decorating the Buongiovanni Chapel in Sant'Agostino (1616), which includes a Correggesque Assumption, along with easel paintings.  His Annunciation (1615) in San Carlo ai Catinari in regarded as one of his best works.  Soon, Lanfranco became the pre-eminent painter of the circle of Pope Paul V. He painted frescoes for the Palazzo Costaguti and a large ceiling fresco in quadratura at the Villa Borghese, The Gods of Olympus or also called Council of the Gods.

In the following year, Lanfranco together with Agostino Tassi and Carlo Saraceni decorated the Sala de' Corazzieri and Sala Regia of the Palazzo del Quirinale. His formal Presentation at the Temple has the sunlit Carraci-like style. In 1622, he painted the Ectasy of Saint Margaret of Cortona (Galleria Platina, Palazzo Pitti, Florence) as an altarpiece for Santa Maria Nuova in Cortona, where Margaret lived and died. The painting could well have inspired the pose in Bernini's famous St Theresa in ecstasy. In 1623–1624, he decorated the Sacchetti Chapel in San Giovanni dei Fiorentini in Rome.

While Paul V's successor, Gregory XV, preferred works by Guercino and Domenichino,  Lanfranco won commissions for the Crucifix Chapel in Santa Maria in Vallicella. Lanfranco's crowning masterpiece, however, and one of the major church fresco decoration of the late 1620s, was his Assumption of the Virgin frescoed on the dome of Sant'Andrea della Valle. Completed in 1627 in sotto in su perspective, the crowded array of figures is a landmark in Baroque painting with bright golden coloration and energy. Lanfranco was influenced by Correggio's pioneering decoration of the Duomo di Parma.

Urban VIII commissioned him a large fresco portraying St. Peter Walking on Waters (1628, now fragmentary), for which Lanfranco gained the title of Knight of the Order of Christ. In 1631, Lanfranco was named Prince (Principe) of the Academy of Saint Luke, the artist's guild in Rome. There is also a fresco by Giovanni Lanfranco above the monument of Pope Clement VIII in Santa Maria Maggiore in (Rome).

From 1634 to 1646, Lanfranco began decorating the dome and pendentives of the Jesuit church of the Gesù Nuovo in Naples in 1634–1637. In 1637–1638, he frescoed the nave and choir of the Certosa of San Martino. This was followed by the decoration of Santi Apostoli in 1638–1646 and the dome of the Cappella of San Gennaro in the Cathedral of Naples. These works would invigorate the efforts of the grand manner Napolitan painters of the second half of the 17th century: Preti, Giordano and Solimena.  He died in Rome in 1647, where his last work was apse of San Carlo ai Catinari.

Legacy and critical assessment
Lanfranco was a versatile and eclectic trainee of the Carracci, and continued their tradition with dramatic flair compared to the often restrained Domenichino, who mimicked mainly Annibale's grand manner. Lanfranco explored new styles, bridged traditions, painted in both mannerist and baroque styles, using a tenebrist and the colorist palette. Among his pupils was Giacinto Brandi.

Selected works
Venus plays the Harp, Galleria Nazionale d'Arte Antica, Rome (Palazzo Barberini)
 Alexander tended by the doctor and Alexander refusing water to drink from his men
The Annunciation (c. 1615–1624) San Carlo ai Catinari, Rome
 Coronation of the Virgin with St. Augustine and St. William of Aquitaine
 Hagar in the Wilderness (Louvre)
 Liberation of Saint Peter (c. 1620–21), Birmingham Museum of Art, Alabama
 Palazzo Quirinale frescoes

References

Sources

External links

Orazio and Artemisia Gentileschi, a fully digitized exhibition catalog from The Metropolitan Museum of Art Libraries, which contains material on Giovanni Lanfranco (see index)
 Lanfranco exhibition in Parma & Rome, with biography and many works
 Six works by Lanfranco, including Assumption of the Virgin

1582 births
1647 deaths
Painters from Parma
16th-century Italian painters
Italian male painters
17th-century Italian painters
Italian Baroque painters
Painters from Rome
Fresco painters
Catholic painters